St Mary's Island is a tiny island in the River Thames in England. It has a size of about 150 m by 50 m.

The island is on the reach above Caversham Lock on the western outskirts of the town of Reading, Berkshire. It is close in to the northern (Caversham) bank in an area called The Fishery and is unpopulated.

See also
Islands in the River Thames

References

External links 
 Berkshire Way walk including a map from the BBC

Geography of Reading, Berkshire
Islands of the River Thames